India: The Rise of an Asian Giant is a 2008 book by Dietmar Rothermund which describes the contemporary state of the major influences on the economy of India.

Chapter synopsis
The chapters of this book are named to be descriptive of the contents and are as follows:

Building a Democratic Nation
Emergence of National Coalitions
Tensions of Federalism
Role in World Affairs
Argument of Power: Atom Bombs and Rockets
Liberalizing a Hidebound Economy
Sick Mills and Strong Powerlooms
Diamonds, Garments, and Software
Quest for Supercomputers
Agriculture: Crisis or Promise
Giant's Shackles: Water, Energy, and Infrastructure
Caste in a Changing Society
Boon of Demographic Dividend
Demand for Education
New Middle Class: Consumers and Savers
Persistence of Poverty
Splendour of the Media
Dynamic Diaspora

Reviews
The review in The Spectator noted that this book is "a meticulous historian's collection of facts, backed by a lifetime's work."

A reviewer for the British Scholar Society said that the "chapters that make up this book are more extended vignettes than comprehensive surveys, offering a short narrative built around a handful of examples and statistics."

Another reviewer said that while the book purports to be an introductory text, it may in fact be too advanced for a beginner, but still - "..no other 'introduction' to India covers more ground than Rothermund's book."

References

External links

Yale University Press books
Indian non-fiction books
Books about globalization
Books about the economy of India